, Yad Vashem recognised 627 Righteous Among the Nations from Germany.

A 
 Elisabeth Abegg (1882–1974), recognised 1967
  (1902–1967), recognised 1965
 Maria and Adolf Althoff (1913–1998), recognised 1995
 Ruth Andreas-Friedrich (1901–1977), recognised 2002
  (1900–1991), recognised 1998
  (1917–1989), recognised 1985
  (1893–1958), recognised 1965

B 

  (1916–1953), recognised 1979
  (1913–1989), recognised 1991
 Albert Battel (1891–1952), recognised 1981
 Gitta Bauer (1919–1990), recognised 1985
  (1914–2011), recognised 2006
 Berthold Beitz (1913–2013), recognised 1973
  (1920–2014), recognised 2006
  (1893–1975), recognised 1979
 Willi Bleicher (1907–1981), recognised 1965
 Otto Busse, recognised 1968

C 

 Hans Georg Calmeyer (1903–1973), recognised 1992
  (1892–1983), recognised 1969
 Eva Cassirer (1920–2009), recognised 2011 alongside her mother Hanna Sotschek
 , recognised 2006

D 

 Hans von Dohnanyi (1902–1945), recognised 2003
  (1880–1954), Elfriede and Heinz Drossel (1916–2008), recognised 1999
 Georg Ferdinand Duckwitz (1904–1973), recognised 1971

E 

 Johanna Eck (1888–1979), recognised 1973
 Gottfried von Einem (1918–1996), recognised 2002
  (1898–1975), recognised 2013

F 

 Hans Fittko, husband of Lisa Fittko; recognised 2000
  (1895–1983), recognised 1976
 Evert Baron Freytag von Loringhoven, recognised 1967
  (1925–2015), recognised 2004
  (b. 1908), recognised 1975
  (1902–1986), recognised 1973
 , recognised 1995

G 

  (1884–1971), recognised 1967
  (1911–2007), recognised 1991
 Hermann Friedrich Graebe (1900–1986), recognised 1965
 Georg (1904–1944) and Anneliese Groscurth (1910–1996), recognised 2005
 Heinrich Grüber (1891–1975), recognised 1964
  (1912–1999), recognised 1986
  (1903–1986), recognised 1984
  (1905–1961), recognised 2017
  (1899–1981), recognised 1971

H 

 Wilhelm Hammann (1897–1955), recognised 1984
 , recognised 1966
  (1896–1970), recognised 1963
 Robert Havemann (1910–1982), recognised 2005
 Fritz Heine (1904–2002), recognised 1986
  (1898–1989), recognised 1969
  (1897–1957), recognised 2003
  (1900–1986), wife of Eberhard Helmrich; recognised 1986
  (1899–1969), husband of Donata Helmrich; recognised 1965
  (1894–1942), recognised 1972
 Herbert Herden (1915–2009), recognised 2004
  (1900–1997) and Carl Hermann (1898–1961), recognised 1976
 Helene and Joseph Höffner (1906–1987), recognised 2003
 , recognised 1971
 Helene Holzman (1891–1968), recognised 2005
 Wilhelm Hosenfeld (1895–1952), recognised 2008
  (1893–1967), recognised 2001
  (1907–2002), recognised 2015

I 

 Frieda Impekoven (b. 1880), recognised 1966

J 

 Helene Jacobs (1906–1993), recognised 1983
  (1920–1984), recognised 1982
  (1929–2011), recognised 1982

K 

 Helmut Kleinicke (1907–1979), recognised 2018
  (1881–1976), recognised 1969
 Walter Kraemer (1892–1941), recognised 1999
 Johanna and Lothar Kreyssig (1898–1986), recognised 2016
  (1909–1972), recognised 1964
  (b. 1915), recognised 2011

L 

  (1915–1992), recognised 2002
 Bernhard Lichtenberg (1875–1943), recognised 2004
 Max Liedtke (1894–1955), recognised 1993
 Gertrud Luckner (1900–1995), recognised 1966

M 

 Hermann Maas (1877–1970), recognised 1964
  (1910–1988), recognised 2016
 Maria von Maltzan (1909–1997), recognised 1987
 Gerhard Marquardt (1904–1983), recognised 1985
  (1891–1972), recognised 1995
  (1895–1979), recognised 2001
  (1885–1964), recognised 2001
  (1897–1953), recognised 2006
  (1898–1972), recognised 1994
 Maimi von Mirbach (1899–1984), recognised 1981
  (1885–1967), recognised 2001
 , recognised 1984

N 

  (1894–1963), recognised 2011
  (1898–1976), recognised 1985

O 

 , recognised 1978
  (1900–1978), recognised 1996
 , recognised 2015
  (1926–1995), recognised 1990 alongside her parents Albert and Maria Meier

P 

  (1922–2012), recognised 2006
 Karl Plagge (1897–1957), recognised 2004
 Dorothee and Harald Poelchau (1903–1972), recognised 1971
 Hedwig Porschütz (1900–1977), recognised 2012 alongside her mother Hedwig Völker

R 

  (1914–1999), recognised 1977
 Eberhard Rebling (1911–2008), recognised 2007
 Irmgard and Friedrich Reck-Malleczewen (1884–1945), recognised 2014
  (1989–1944), recognised 2005
  (1901–1944), recognised 2005
  (1901–1981), recognised 2003
  (1906–1943), recognised 1995
  (1883–1955), recognised 2012
  (1869–1944), recognised 2004

S 

  (1882–1945), recognised 2001
 Hildegard Schaeder (1902–1984), recognised 2000
 Elisabeth Schiemann (1881–1972), recognised 2014
 Oskar (1908–1974) and Emilie Schindler (1907–2001), recognised 1993
 Barthel Schink (1927–1944), recognised 1982
  (born 1906), recognised 2004
 Elisabeth Schmitz (1893–1977), recognised 2011
  (1908–2004), recognised 1977
 , recognised 1968
 Gustav Schröder (1885–1959), recognised 1993
 Hanning Schröder (1896–1987), recognised 1978
 Eduard Schulte (1891–1966), recognised 1988
  (1899–1975), recognised 1968
  (1896–1967), recognised 2006
 Helmuth and Annemarie Sell, recognised 1981
 Hans Söhnker (1903–1981), recognised 2017
 Margarete Sommer (1893–1965), recognised 2003
  (1890–1961), recognised 2001
 Fritz Strassmann (1902–1980), recognised 1985
 Utje and Friedrich Strindberg (1897–1978), recognised 2001
  (1893–1942), recognised 1979
  (1897–1962), recognised 2013

T 

 Gina and Edwin Tietjens (1894–1944), recognised 1997
 Ilse Totzke (1913–1987), recognised 1995

W 

 Hans Walz (1883–1974), recognised 1969
  (1898–1989), recognised 1974
 Armin T. Wegner (1886–1978), recognised 1967
 Otto Weidt (1883–1947), recognised 1971
 Ludwig Wörl (1906–1967), recognised 1963
 Lilly Wust (1913–2006), recognised 1995

Z 

  (1910–2001), recognised 1994
  (1884–1974), recognised 2000

External links
 Daniel Fraenkel, The German Righteous Among the Nations at yadvashem.org.

References 

 
German
Righteous Among the Nations
Righteous Among the Nations